The 1939 Finnish Grand Prix was a Grand Prix motor race held at Eläintarharata on 7 May 1939.

Classification

Grand Prix race reports
Grand Prix
Finnish
Finnish Grand Prix